The fifth season of Homicide: Life on the Street aired in the United States on the NBC television network from 20 September 1996 to 16 May 1997 and contained 22 episodes. A new opening sequence debuted with the start of this season, including elements of a police investigation (murder weapon, dusting for fingerprints, etc.) and a growing chatter of radio transmissions behind the theme music. In addition, pictures of the actors were displayed alongside their names for the first time. The sequence ends with the ringing of the squadroom phone and a voice answering, "Homicide."

Two new characters appeared during this season: Chief Medical Examiner Julianna Cox (a regular character portrayed by Michelle Forbes); and Detective Terri Stivers (a recurring character portrayed by guest star Toni Lewis), a Narcotics officer who works with Homicide to bring down local drug kingpin Luther Mahoney. 

The two-part season finale introduced Detective Paul Falsone (portrayed by Jon Seda), a member of the Auto Squad briefly on loan to Homicide, re-introduced Stuart Gharty (portrayed by Peter Gerety), now a detective assigned to Internal Investigations, and marked the return of Detective Megan Russert (Isabella Hofmann) from her season-long leave of absence in France. It also marked the final regular appearances of Sgt. Kay Howard (Melissa Leo) and unit videographer J. H. Brodie (Max Perlich).

The DVD box set of season 5 was released for Region 1 on September 28, 2004. The set includes all 22 season 5 episodes on six discs.

Episodes

References

 
 
 

1996 American television seasons
1997 American television seasons